M Abdul Mazid is an agriculture researcher in Bangladesh who specializes in rice. He received the Independence Day Award in 2016 for his special contribution to food security in Bangladesh.

Career 
Mazid has worked with rice research at the International Rice Research Institute and is credited with reducing the effects of Monga, a famine like condition in Northern Bangladesh.

References 

Recipients of the Independence Day Award
Living people
Bangladeshi agriculturalists
Year of birth missing (living people)